The 2018 summer transfer window for English football transfers opened on 17 May and closed on 9 August. Additionally, players without a club may join at any time, clubs may sign players on loan at any time, and clubs may sign a goalkeeper on an emergency loan if they have no registered goalkeeper available. This list includes transfers featuring at least one Premier League or EFL club which were completed after the end of the winter 2017–18 transfer window and before the end of the 2018 summer window.

2018 Summer Transfers 
All players and clubs without a flag are English. Note that while Swansea City, Cardiff City, Newport County and Wrexham are affiliated with the Football Association of Wales and thus take the Welsh flag, they play in the English football league system, and so their transfers are included here.

Transfers

Loans

Unattached players

Notes 
 Player officially joined his club on 8 June 2018.
 Player officially joined his club on 1 July 2018.
 Player officially joined his club on 1 August 2018.

References

Transfers Summer 2018
Summer 2018
English